Short Mountain is a mountain ridge that runs southwest northeast through Hampshire and Hardy counties in West Virginia's Eastern Panhandle, rising to its greatest elevation at Bald Knob near Arkansaw, West Virginia. Short Mountain's name is derived from its original name of Short Arse Mountain.

See also 
 Short Mountain Wildlife Management Area

References 

Ridges of Hampshire County, West Virginia
Ridges of Hardy County, West Virginia
Ridges of West Virginia